Dance Mania may refer to:

Dance Mania (record label), a Chicago record label
Dance Mania (album), a 1958 album by Tito Puente
Dancing mania, the phenomenon of large groups of people dancing for no clear reason